Pernilla Wiberg  (born 15 October 1970) is a Swedish former alpine ski racer and businesswoman. She competed on the World Cup circuit between 1990 and 2002, where she became one of the few all-event winners. Having won two Olympic gold medals, four World Championships and one World Cup overall title, she is one of the most successful alpine ski racers of the 1990s. On club level, she represented Norrköpings SK. She was born in Norrköping.

Career
After competing without much success in two junior world championships in 1987 and 1988, Wiberg got her international breakthrough in the early 1990s. In her World Cup debut in Vemdalen, Sweden, on 13 March 1990, she finished 5th in slalom, and five days later she finished 3rd in giant slalom in Åre. In the following season of 1991, she claimed three World Cup victories and a giant slalom gold medal at the 1991 World Championships in Saalbach. Her Alpine World Championship gold was the first for a Scandinavian woman in 33 years. Until the end of her career in 2002, Wiberg won an additional 21 World Cup races, earning her a total of 24 World Cup race victories, including at least one victory in each of the five different alpine disciplines. In five World Championships she won six medals: four gold, one silver, and one bronze.

Her finest season was in 1996–1997 when she won ten World Cup races and took the overall, slalom, and combined titles.  She dethroned the previous years World Cup Overall winner Katja Seizinger by over 500 points.  In the slalom discipline she was incredibly dominant with 5 wins, 2 silvers, 1 bronze, and 1 4th in 9 World Cup slalom races.  She won her first ever World Cup downhill in the World Cup finale weekend, making her one of the first women ever to win World Cup races in all 5 disciplines.  She also led the World Cup Super G standings until the final race, and needed only a 5th-place finish in the Super G on World Cup finale weekend (with Gerg's 2nd-place finish) to secure the season Super G title.   Unfortunately on pace for a 2nd or 3rd-place finish and to easily reach this, she went off course, losing the season Super G crystal globe to Hilde Gerg.   Wiberg considers the Super G her second best event after the slalom and her favorite event to ski, but it is where she has had the most bad luck and disappointment through her 4th place in Lillehammer, mistakes at the 96 and 97 worlds, and highly unlucky loss of the Super G season crystal globe in the 97 season.

Today, Wiberg comments alpine skiing for Sveriges Television.

Olympics
Wiberg won the giant slalom gold in the 1992 Winter Olympics in Albertville and the combination gold medal in 1994 at Lillehammer. At both of these Olympics, Wiberg was the most successful Swedish athlete. In 1998 in Nagano, she won the downhill silver medal; Wiberg holds this achievement to be the best of her career. In her final Olympics in 2002 at age 31, she failed to reach the top ten and finished 14th in downhill and 12th in super-G. The Olympic super-G was to be her final international race, as she announced her retirement a few weeks later, following surgery on her knees.

Awards
In 1991, Wiberg was awarded the Svenska Dagbladet Gold Medal. The jury's motivation was: "For the sensational giant slalom victory in the World Championships, secured through a bold and skillful second leg." The same year, 1991, she was awarded Jerring Award, an award she received again the following year.

International Olympic Committee
Wiberg was elected a member of the International Olympic Committee in 2002 and served an eight-year mandate until 2010. She was a member of the following commissions: Athletes’ (2002–), Sport and Environment (2002), Ethics (2003–), Coordination for the XXI Olympic Winter Games in Vancouver in 2010 (2003–), Nominations (2003–). On 2 September 2008, IOC announced that Wiberg would chair a commission appointed by the president of IOC, Jacques Rogge. The commission would analyse the projects of the shortlisted cities candidating for 1st Winter Youth Olympic Games.

Activism
Pernilla is today a member of the ‘Champions for Peace’ club, a group of 114 (as of 29 November 2018) famous elite athletes committed to serving peace in the world through sport, created by Peace and Sport, a Monaco-based international organization.
Other Champions for Peace members include Ukrainian former pole vaulter, Sergey Bubka, British long-distance runner, Paula Radcliffe, and Serbian tennis player, Novak Djokovic.

Personal life
Together with her husband Bødvar Bjerke, Wiberg has two children; Axel (b. 2003) and Sofia (b. 2007). Since 1995, she lives in Monaco.

World Cup results

Season titles
5 titles (1 overall, 1 slalom, 3 combined)

Season standings

Race victories
24 race victories (2 downhill, 3 super G, 2 giant slalom, 14 slalom, 3 combined)

Discography

Singles

See also
List of FIS Alpine Ski World Cup women's race winners

References

External links
 
 
 pernilla-wiberg.com – official site
 Pernilla Wiberg Hotel in Sweden.

Swedish female alpine skiers
Olympic alpine skiers of Sweden
International Olympic Committee members
Alpine skiers at the 1992 Winter Olympics
Alpine skiers at the 1994 Winter Olympics
Alpine skiers at the 1998 Winter Olympics
Alpine skiers at the 2002 Winter Olympics
Olympic gold medalists for Sweden
Olympic silver medalists for Sweden
Swedish expatriate sportspeople in Monaco
Olympic medalists in alpine skiing
1970 births
Living people
Sportspeople from Norrköping
FIS Alpine Ski World Cup champions
Medalists at the 1998 Winter Olympics
Medalists at the 1994 Winter Olympics
Medalists at the 1992 Winter Olympics